Bishop Claudiu-Lucian Pop (born 22 July 1972) is a Romanian Greek Catholic hierarch, who serves as the Eparchial Bishop of Cluj-Gherla since 14 April 2021. Previously he served as the Titular Bishop of Mariamme and Curial bishop of Romanian Greek Catholic Major Archeparchy of Făgăraș and Alba Iulia since 21 November 2011 until 14 April 2021.

Life
Bishop Pop, after graduation of the school education and the Biological and Chemical Lyceum, joined the Chemical Faculty of the University of Bucharest in 1990, but one year later he began philosophical and theological studies in Rome, Italy in the Pontifical Romanian College (1991–1999), where he graduated Pontifical Urbaniana University and Pontifical Gregorian University. During this time he was ordained as priest on 23 July 1995 for the Romanian Catholic Eparchy of Oradea Mare. From 1999 until 2007 he served as vice-rector, and subsequently rector of the Romanian Greek-Catholic mission in Paris, France. And after that, during 2007–2011, he was a Rector of the Pontifical Romanian College (Pio Romeno) in Rome.

On 21 November 2011, he was confirmed by the Pope Benedict XVI as an Curial Bishop of the Romanian Greek Catholic Major Archeparchy of Făgăraș and Alba Iulia and Titular Bishop of Mariamme. On 8 December 2011, he was consecrated as bishop by Cardinal Leonardo Sandri, Prefect of the Congregation for the Oriental Churches and other hierarchs of the Romanian Greek Catholic Church.

References

1972 births
Living people
People from Satu Mare County
Pontifical Urban University alumni
Pontifical Gregorian University alumni
Romanian Greek-Catholic bishops
21st-century Eastern Catholic bishops
Eastern Catholic bishops in Romania